Pantelei Sandulache (4 May 1956 – 30 January 2021) was a Moldovan politician who served as a Member of Parliament between 1990 and 1994.

References

1956 births
2021 deaths
Moldovan MPs 1990–1994